Linda Smircich (born 1948) is a Professor of Management in the Isenberg School of Management, University of Massachusetts Amherst where she teaches Organizational Alternative Paradigms. She is part of the critical management studies approach field and a critical researcher in organizational culture and gender.

Biography
Linda Smircich has a B.S. from State University of New York at Oswego, M.B.A. and Ph.D. from Syracuse University. She was previously Chair of the Management Department at the Isenberg School of Management at the University of Massachusetts Amherst.

Her research interests are in the fields of organizational behavior and theory; qualitative research, alternative paradigms; cultural perspectives on organizations and management; organization change; gender and organization, feminist theory. Her earlier scholarly writing were centered on organizational culture, but currently she is pursuing a cultural and critical perspective on organization and management. Linda Smircich various publications are often co-authored with Marta Calàs and apply insights from cultural studies, postmodernism, feminism, and post-colonial theory to analyze organizational topics such as leadership, business ethics, and globalization.

She is co-editor of the international, interdisciplinary journal Organization, together with Gibson Burrell, Marta Calàs, and Mike Reed.

Awards
 Outstanding College Teacher Award, 2009 Isenberg School of Management
 Distinguished PhD Alumni Award, 2008 Syracuse University Whitman School of Management
 Sage Award for Scholarly Contribution, 2006 Gender, Diversity & Organizations Division, Academy of Management

On Smircich and Calás
 Joanna Brewis, "Othering Organization Theory: Marta Calás and Linda Smircich", The Sociological Review, Special Issue: Sociological Review Monograph Series: Contemporary Organization Theory, edited by Campbell Jones and Rolland Munro, Volume 53, Issue Supplement s1, pp. 80–94, October 2005

Selected publications

Books
 (1992) Organizations as shared meanings
 (1992) Authenticity in the superior-subordinate relationship : its measurement and relationship to commitment, involvement, role clarity, influence style, and satisfaction
 (1993) Rewriting gender into organization theorizing
 (1995) Critical perspectives on organization and management
 (1997) Postmodern management theory
 (1999) From "the woman's" point of view, feminist approaches to organization studies with Marta B Calás

Articles
 Gareth Morgan and Linda Smircich (1980) The Case for Qualitative Research; The Academy of Management Review Vol. 5, No. 4 (Oct., 1980), pp. 491–500 
 Linda Smircich and Gareth Morgan (1982). Leadership: The Management of Meaning. The Journal of Applied Behavioral Science, 18, 257-273.  
 Linda Smircich (1983). Concepts of Culture and Organizational Analysis. Administrative Science Quarterly, 28(3): 339-358.
 M. B. Calas and Linda Smircich (2014) Engendering the Organizational: Organization Studies and Feminist Theorizing. In P. Adler, P. du Gay, G. Morgan & M. Reed (Eds.) The Oxford Handbook of Sociology, Social Theory and Organization Studies: Contemporary Currents. London: Oxford University Press.
 M. B. Calas, L. Smircich, and E. Holvino (2014) Theorizing Gender- and Organization: Changing Times. ...Changing Theories? In S. Kumra, R. Simpson & R. Burke (Eds.) The Oxford Handbook of Gender in Organizations. London: Oxford University Press.
 M. B. Calas, H. Ou, and L. Smircich (2013) ’Woman‘ on the Move: Mobile Subjectivities after Intersectionality, Equality, Diversity and Inclusion.

References

External links
 Personal page @ UMass

1948 births
Living people
American business theorists
American feminists
Critical theorists
LGBT feminists
Postmodern feminists
Researchers in organizational studies
State University of New York at Oswego alumni
Syracuse University alumni
University of Massachusetts Amherst faculty